Tudy may refer to:

People
 Tudy of Landevennec, Breton saint

Places
 Île-Tudy, France
 St Tudy, United Kingdom